Toxicocalamus  is a genus of snakes in the family Elapidae. The genus is endemic to New Guinea.

Description
The second longest is the holotype of T. grandis, which measures  SVL,  TTL. Most species are under  TTL, and several are the thickness of bootlaces. In general females have longer bodies than males, but much shorter tails.

Venom
Members of genus Toxicocalamus are venomous, with fixed front-fangs (a dental arrangement known as proteroglyphous), but are not known to be a threat to humans, being unaggressive, of modest size, and secretive. However, the venom of T. longissimus is believed to be fairly toxic, since it contains three-finger toxins (3FTx), Type-I phospholipase A (PLA) and snake venom metalloproteinase (SVMP), while T. buergersi possesses long venom glands than extend backwards into the body cavity.

Behaviour
Although most species of Toxicocalamous are believed to be diurnal, they are fossorial, or semi-fossorial, in habit and rarely encountered.

Geographic range
Many species of Toxicocalamus are localised in their distribution and associated with particular islands or mountain ranges. Several species are poorly known, with four known only from their holotypes. Toxicocalamus is probably not closely related to the Australian Elapidae, being endemic to the island of New Guinea,  northern coastal offshore islands, i.e. Seleo Is. (Sandaun Province, PNG); Walis Is. and Tarawai Is. (East Sepik Province, PNG), and Karkar Is. (Madang Province, PNG), and the archipelagoes of Milne Bay Province to the southeast, i.e. d'Entrecasteaux Archipelago (Goodenough Is., Fergusson Is., and Normanby Is.), Woodlark Is., and the Louisiade Archipelago (Misima Is., Sudest Is., and Rossel Is.).

Diet
The prey of snakes in the genus Toxicocalamus appears to consist almost entirely of earthworms, particularly the giant earthworms of the Megascolecidae, hence the adoption of the term "worm-eating snakes" for species within this genus.

Reproduction
In common with other tropical elapids, Toxicocalamus is believed to reproduce by oviparity, with clutch sizes of 3–7 recorded, dependent on species and size of the female.

Natural history
The natural history of many species of Toxicocalamus is almost entirely undocumented, due to a paucity of specimens and the infrequence of their encounter in the field.

Species
The following 24 species, one of which has two subspecies, are currently recognised as being valid in the genus Toxicocalamus:
 Toxicocalamus atratus Kraus, Kaiser,, & O’Shea, 2022 –  Black forest snake
 Toxicocalamus buergersi (Sternfeld, 1913)  – Buergers' forest snake, Torricelli Mountains snake
 Toxicocalamus cratermontanus Kraus, 2017 – Crater Mountain snake
 Toxicocalamus ernstmayri O'Shea, Parker & Kaiser, 2015   – Star Mountains snake, Star Mountains worm-eating snake
 Toxicocalamus goodenoughensis  J.R. Roberts & C. Austin, 2020
 Toxicocalamus grandis (Boulenger, 1914)  – Setakwa River snake, Setekwa River forest snake
 Toxicocalamus holopelturus McDowell, 1969  – Mt. Rossel forest snake, Rossel Island snake
 Toxicocalamus lamingtoni Kinghorn, 1928 – Mount Lamington forest snake
 Toxicocalamus loennbergii Boulenger, 1908 – Lönnberg’s forest snake
 Toxicocalamus longhagen Roberts, Iova, & Austin, 2022 
 Toxicocalamus longissimus Boulenger, 1896  – Fergusson Island forest snake, Woodlark forest snake, Woodlark Island snake
 Toxicocalamus loriae (Boulenger, 1898)  – common worm-eating snake, Loria forest snake
Toxicocalamus mattisoni Kraus, 2020
 Toxicocalamus mintoni Kraus, 2009  – Minton's forest snake, Sudest Island snake
 Toxicocalamus misimae McDowell, 1969  – Misima Island forest snake, Misima Island snake
 Toxicocalamus nigrescens Kraus, 2017 – Fergusson Island worm-eating snake
 Toxicocalamus nymani (Lönnberg, 1900) –  Loria forest snake
 Toxicocalamus pachysomus Kraus, 2009  – Cloudy Mountains worm-eating snake
 Toxicocalamus preussi (Sternfeld, 1913)  – Preuss's forest snake, Preuss' slender worm-eating snake
 Toxicocalamus preussi preussi (Sternfeld, 1913)  – Preuss's Sepek forest snake, Preuss' slender worm-eating snake
 Toxicocalamus preussi angusticinctus  Bogert & Matalas, 1945  – Fly River forest snake, Fly River slender worm-eating snake
 Toxicocalamus pumehanae O'Shea, Allison & Kaiser, 2018   – Managalas Plateau snake
 Toxicocalamus spilolepidotus McDowell, 1969  – Krakte Mountains spotted snake, spotted forest snake
 Toxicocalamus spilorhynchus Kraus, Kaiser,, & O’Shea, 2022 
 Toxicocalamus stanleyanus Boulenger, 1903  – Owen Stanley Mountains snake, Owen Stanley Range forest snake
 Toxicocalamus vertebralis Kraus, Kaiser,, & O’Shea, 2022 – striped forest snake

Nota bene: A binomial authority in parentheses indicates that the species was originally described in a genus other than Toxicocalamus. These former genera, Apistocalamus, Apisthocalamus, Pseudapistocalamus, Pseudapisthocalamus, Ultrocalamus, and Vanapina, are now synonyms of Toxicocalamus.

Taxonomy
The former species  Pseudapisthocalamus nymani Lönnberg, 1900; Apisthocalamus pratti Boulenger, 1904; A. loennbergii Boulenger, 1908; and A. lamingtoni Kinghorn, 1928; are synonyms of T. loriae, Vanapina lineata De Vis, 1905  is a synonym of T. longissimus, and Ultrocalamus latisquamatus Schüz, 1929  is a synonym of T. preussi.

Most of the described species are poorly known and rarely encountered. The most widely distributed, and most commonly encountered, species is T. loriae (itself a possible species complex), which accounts for 66% of all Toxicocalamus specimens in museum collections. T. loriae is frequently encountered in the Highlands, where large numbers have been collected in village gardens along the Wahgi River valley of Simbu Province, PNG.  The next most frequently encountered and widely distributed species are T. preussi and T. stanleyanus. All the other species are much less well known and localised in distribution.

Also on mainland New Guinea, T. buergersi is known from only six specimens, from the Torricelli Mountains in the Sepik region (Sandaun and East Sepik Provinces), PNG; T. spilolepidotus is known from two specimens, from the Kratke Range, Eastern Highlands Province, PNG; T. pachysomus is known from its holotype, from the Cloudy Mountains, Milne Bay Province; PNG, T. cratermontanus from its holotype, from Crater Mountain, Simbu Province, PNG, while T. ernstmayri was only known from its holotype in the Star Mountains of Western Province, PNG, until a second specimen was observed crawling across mine-workings at the Ok Tedi Mine, in the Star Mountains. Toxicocalamus grandis is also only known from its holotype, collected on the Setakwa River, western New Guinea, in 1912, (the only species represented by a type specimen west of the WNG/PNG border), and T. pumehanae is also only known from its holotype, from the Managalas Plateau, Oro Province, PNG,.

On the islands of Milne Bay, T. holopelturus is known from 19 specimens from Rossel Island, also known as Yela; T. misimae is known from six specimens from Misima Island; and T. mintoni is only known from its holotype, from Sudest Island, also known as Vanantai or Tagula Island, all in the Louisiade Archipelago. Toxicocalamus nigrescens is only known from its holotype and paratype, from Fergusson Island, in the d'Entercasteaux Archipelago, while T. longissimus is known from 12 specimens from Woodlark Island.

References

Further reading

 
Venomous snakes
Snake genera
Taxa named by George Albert Boulenger